Andrzej Tarło (died c. 1531) was a Polish noble. He was Chorąży of Lwów. In 1524, he married Katarzyna Michowska.

15th-century births
1531 deaths
16th-century Polish nobility
Andrzej
15th-century Polish nobility